Kazik may refer to:

Slavic first name, a diminutive of Kazimierz (Polish) or Kazimir (Russian)
Kazik Staszewski
Nom de guerre  of Simcha Rotem, a member of the Jewish underground in Warsaw during World War II
Kazimierz J. Kasperek, veteran from the Polish Navy who was fighting during World War II
Wanda Gertz, Polish female soldier who served in the Polish Legion during World War I while masquerading as a man, under the name "Kazimierz 'Kazik' Zuchowicz"
Alternative Romanization for Gazik, a Persian-language place name
Kazik, Kecik, a dialect of Chulym language and a tribe which gave the name to the dialect